China National Highway 101 is a major trunk route connecting Beijing to Shenyang, Liaoning. In Beijing it is known as Jingshun Road or Jingmi Road for connecting central Beijing to Shunyi District and Miyun District, although the actual road goes far beyond these two locations.

It leaves Beijing at Dongzhimen and heads for Sanyuanqiao, running alongside the Airport Expressway until Beigao, and then continues north while leaning toward the Jingcheng Expressway.

Major Connections
Note: Only connections to important city roads, expressways and other China National Highways (G level) are listed.

2nd Ring Road (Beijing): Dongzhimen Bridge
3rd Ring Road (Beijing): Sanyuan Bridge
4th Ring Road (Beijing): Siyuan Bridge
5th Ring Road (Beijing): Wuyuan Bridge
6th Ring Road (Beijing): Liuyuan Bridge
China National Highway 111: South of Huairou District; splits into independent G101 road to the northeast
China National Highway 112: Hongshili, Hebei
China National Highway 306: Lingyuan, Liaoning
Jinchao Expressway: West of Chaoyang, Liaoning
China National Highway 305: Northwest of Beipiao, Liaoning and Mayouying, Liaoning
Jinfu Expressway: Wangfu, Liaoning
China National Highway 304: Zhangwu, Liaoning
Shenyang Round City Expressway: Lai'ertun Bridge, Shenyang, Liaoning

Major Localities

Beijing Section
 Sanyuanqiao
 Caochangdi
 Huoshenying
 Miyun
 Gubeikou

Hebei Section
 Luanping
 Chengde
 Pingquan

Liaoning Section
 Lingyuan
 Jianping
 Chaoyang
 Beipiao
 Mayoying
 Fuxin
 Zhangwu
 Yinjia
 Shenyang

101
Road transport in Beijing
Transport in Hebei
Transport in Liaoning